Dmitri Yaroslavich Ivanov (born 7 June 1994) is a former Russian football defender.

Club career
He made his debut in the Russian Football National League for FC Baltika Kaliningrad on 25 May 2013 in a game against FC Torpedo Moscow.

References

External links
 
 Career summary by sportbox.ru

1994 births
Living people
Russian footballers
Association football defenders
FC Baltika Kaliningrad players
III liga players
Russian expatriate footballers
Expatriate footballers in Poland